The 2015–16 Swazi Premier League season was the 2015–16 season of the top level of football competition in Swaziland. It began on 22 August 2015 and concluded on 15 May 2016.

Standings

References

Football leagues in Eswatini
Premier League
Premier League
Swaziland